is a series of visual combat books published by Hobby Japan. The supplement to the Queen's Blade series, it features licensed female characters from other games and works, including those from Hobby Japan. Like Queen's Blade before it, it is also compatible with Flying Buffalo's  Lost Worlds gamebooks. The first gamebook, featuring Alice, was released on November 30, 2007, with a total of nineteen gamebooks released as of June 29, 2012. A novel adaptation by Eiji Okita and Eiichi Shitara was published by Kenkyusha from April to July 2009. A video game adaptation of Queen's Gate was developed by Bandai Namco Games for the PlayStation Portable and released on July 28, 2011.

Plot
In the original game, the general story comes from Alice's bio: she is a treasure hunter who one day discovers the "Queen's Gate", which unleashes a battle across space-time.

In the novels, the plot is expanded a little more (though characters from other franchises do not appear), introducing her rival Dorothy, Alice's mother Lewis, and Dorothy's mother Glinda, as they fight against various monsters.

Characters

An original character from Nitroplus who wields a pair of modified Mauser C96 pistols with built-in combat knives and a whip that she wears as a tail. Illustrated by Niθ.

From the anime series Moetan. Illustrated by POP.

From the Samurai Shodown video game series. Illustrated by Tasuku Iizuki.

From The King of Fighters and Fatal Fury video game series. Illustrated by Mahiru Izumi.

From the Guilty Gear video game series. Illustrated by Takumi Inoue.

From Samurai Shodown. Illustrated by Otsudo Shinozuki.

From Samurai Shodown. Illustrated by BLADE.

From the Dead or Alive video game series. Illustrated by Insert it's.

From Tekken 5: Dark Resurrection. Illustrated by Meiwa Morita.

From The Qwaser of Stigmata. Illustrated by Hoods Entertainment.

From the light novel and anime series Demon King Daimao. Illustrated by Zundarepon.

From the light novel and anime series Hyakka Ryōran Samurai Girls. Illustrated by Mahiru Izumi.

From the Soulcalibur series. Illustrated by 2-go.

From Hyakka Ryōran Samurai Girls. Illustrated by Keitaro Arima.

From the BlazBlue series. Illustrated by Nagi Takatsuki.

From the Soulcalibur series. Illustrated by Isse.

From the Koihime Musō series. Illustrated by Takumi Inoue.

From Soulcalibur V. Illustrated by refeia.

From the mahjong games Idol Janshi Suchie-Pai. Illustrated by Kenichi Sonoda.

Video game characters

Protagonists

The main heroine of Queen's Gate: Spiral Chaos. Illustrated by Poyoyon Rock.

From the Hyper Nurse series. Illustrated by Junichi Inoue.

From the video game Wonder Momo. Illustrated by Poyoyon Rock.

Antagonists

Illustrated by Atsuko Ishida.

Illustrated by Keiji Gotoh.

Illustrated by Makoto Koga.

Illustrated by Poyoyon Rock.

Gal Monsters

One of the Gal Monsters featured in the game. Illustrated by Y Nin.

One of the Gal Monsters featured in the game. Illustrated by Shinichiro Otsuka.

One of the Gal Monsters featured in the game. Illustrated by Makoto Koga.

One of the Gal Monsters featured in the game. Illustrated by Muraneko.

One of the Gal Monsters featured in the game. Illustrated by Muraneko.

One of the Gal Monsters featured in the game. Illustrated by Keiji Gotoh.

Novel characters

Protagonists

She is Alice's childhood friend, and became her rival as a treasure hunter in school. Although she isn't clever, she has the specific skill of not getting trapped ever, and she usually forestalls Alice. People call her a "good luck fairy". Illustrated by Niθ.

Dodgson Foundation

Alice's mother. Her look is that of an intellectual woman, with glasses and a ponytail. A world-leading treasure hunter, she went missing when she discovered Queen's Gate. Although she prides herself in her gun using .600 Nitro Express rounds, 20 times the power of Alice's. Lewis can stand the terrible recoil even when firing it one-handed. Illustrated by Niθ.

Baum Foundation

Dorothy's mother. She once formed a duo with Alice's mother. Illustrated by Niθ.

Irukinuf's Cult

Queen Faction
Rin / Faye Wright

Leonidas

Al-Kāhinat

Zenobia

Alp Arslan

Irukinuf

Trump Soldiers

Tentacle King Faction
Rama

Musanna

Moonlight

Harald

Finn McCool

Swodar Nyarmain

Other characters
Gate Watcher

Kwun

Media

Gamebooks
Alice – Released November 30, 2007.
A limited edition "Boost Version" of Alice was also released with the "Special Set" during Hobby Japan's 2011 MegaHobby Expo. It is now available in Hobby Japan's online shop.
Ink Nijihara – Released November 30, 2007.
Iroha – Released April 18, 2008.
Mai Shiranui – Released October 31, 2008.
A limited-edition 2P version of Mai was released on May 23, 2009 with a limited edition PVC statuette by Volks.
Dizzy – Released November 28, 2009.
Mina Majikina – Released November 28, 2009.
Cham Cham – Released February 27, 2010.
Kasumi – Released February 27, 2010.
Lili – Released April 30, 2010.
Junko Hattori – Released June 25, 2010.
Ekaterina "Katja" Kurae – Released June 25, 2010.
Jubei Yagyu – Released September 30, 2010.
Isabella "Ivy" Valentime – Released March 25, 2011.
Yukimura Sanada – Released April 28, 2011.
Noel Vermillion – Released August 12, 2011.
Taki – Released September 30, 2011.
Kanu – Released January 20, 2012.
Pyrhha – Released March 17, 2012.
Suchie-Pai – Released June 29, 2012.

Novel
A novel adaptation of Queen's Gate was written by Eiji Okita and Eiichi Shitara with illustrations by Niθ and Kanko Nakamura. Three volumes were published by Kenkyusha between April 1, 2009 and July 1, 2009.

Video game
A video game adaptation, titled , was developed by Bandai Namco Games for the PlayStation Portable. Released on July 28, 2011, the game is the sequel to Queen's Blade: Spiral Chaos, featuring characters from the Queen's Gate series as well as characters from the original series. Like the first game, Queen's Gate: Spiral Chaos also features an original storyline with game-exclusive characters. A limited edition version of the game was also released, featuring a Maron Makaron figure from Figma.

References

External links
Official site 
Queen's Gate: Spiral Chaos official site 

2009 Japanese novels
2011 video games
Gamebooks
Japan-exclusive video games
PlayStation Portable-only games
Queen's Blade
PlayStation Portable games
Crossover role-playing video games
Video games developed in Japan